Platymiscium is a genus of flowering plants in the family Fabaceae, and was recently assigned to the informal monophyletic Pterocarpus clade within the Dalbergieae.  It has a Neotropical distribution, from northern Mexico to southern Brazil. Platymiscium is the only genus in the family with opposite leaves in all its species. Its wood has various uses, mostly for constructions and furniture.

Species
Platymiscium comprises the following species:

 Platymiscium albertinae Standl. & L. O. Williams

 Platymiscium calyptratum M. Sousa & Klitg.

 Platymiscium curuense N. Zamora and Klitg.

 Platymiscium darienense Dwyer

 Platymiscium dimorphandrum Donn. Smith ex Donn. Smith

 Platymiscium filipes Benth.
 Platymiscium floribundum Vogel
 var. floribundum Vogel.
 var. latifolium (Benth.) Benth.
 var. nitens (Vogel) Klitgaard
 var. obtusifolium (Harms) Klitgaard

 Platymiscium gracile Benth.
 Platymiscium hebestachyum Benth.
 Platymiscium jejunum Klitg.
 Platymiscium lasiocarpum Sandwith

 Platymiscium parviflorum Benth.

 Platymiscium pinnatum (Jacq.) Dugand
 subsp. pinnatum (Jacq.) Dugand
 var. diadelphum (S. F. Blake) Klitg.
 var. pinnatum (Jacq.) Dugand
 var. ulei (Harms ex Harms) Klitgaard
 subsp. polystachyum (Benth.) Klitg.

 Platymiscium pubescens Micheli
 subsp. fragrans (Rusby) Klitgaard
 subsp. pubescens Micheli
 subsp. zehntneri (Harms) Klitgaard
 Platymiscium speciosum Vogel
 Platymiscium stipulare Benth. ex Benth.

 Platymiscium trifoliolatum Benth. ex Benth.
 Platymiscium trinitatis Benth.
 var. duckei (Huber) Klitgaard
 var. nigrum (Ducke) Klitgaard
 var. trinitatis Benth.

 Platymiscium yucatanum Standl.

References

External links
 
 

Dalbergieae
Fabaceae genera
Taxonomy articles created by Polbot